The streak-breasted honeyeater or streaky-breasted honeyeater (Territornis reticulata) is a species of bird in the family Meliphagidae. 
It is found on Timor island. 
Its natural habitats are subtropical or tropical moist lowland forest, subtropical or tropical mangrove forest, and subtropical or tropical moist montane forest.

References

streak-breasted honeyeater
Birds of Timor
streak-breasted honeyeater
Taxonomy articles created by Polbot
Taxobox binomials not recognized by IUCN